The Minister of Finance is a councilor of state and chief of the Ministry of Finance. The position is since October 2021 held by Trygve Slagsvold Vedum of the Centre Party who is a member of Støre's Cabinet.

List of ministers

Key

1st Ministry (finance affairs) (March–November 1814)

5th  Ministry (finance affairs) (November 1814-1818)

Ministry of Finance, Trade and Customs (1818-1846)

Ministry of Finance and Customs (1846-2000)

Ministry of Finance (2000-)

See also
Norwegian Ministry of Finance

Notes

References

Finance
1814 establishments in Norway